Ronald Tylor Rivero Kuhn (born 29 January 1980 in Santa Cruz de la Sierra) is a Bolivian football central defender who currently plays for Real Potosí in the Liga de Fútbol Profesional Boliviano.

Rivero has earned 29 caps for the Bolivia national team since his debut in 2008.

References

External links
 

1980 births
Living people
Sportspeople from Santa Cruz de la Sierra
Bolivian footballers
Bolivian people of German descent
Bolivia international footballers
Bolivian Primera División players
Universitario de Sucre footballers
Club Bolívar players
Club Blooming players
Bolivian expatriate footballers
Expatriate footballers in China
Chinese Super League players
Shenzhen F.C. players
2011 Copa América players
Association football defenders